Mecidiye or Médjidié may refer to:

 Mecidiye, Bozkurt
 Mecidiye, Ezine
 Mecidiye, Erzincan
 Mecidiye, Karacabey, a village
 Mecidiye, Keşan, a village
 Mecidiye, Lapseki
 Mecidiye, Savaştepe, a village
 Order of the Medjidie
 Ottoman cruiser Mecidiye

See also
 Mecidiye Kışlası
 Mecidiye Marşı